Party of Ivan Pernar (Croatian: Stranka Ivana Pernara or SIP) is a political party in Croatia, formed on 7 July 2019 by former members of the political party Human Shield. It is named after its leader, Ivan Pernar.

Foundation 
Pernar was elected as the party's President during the party's inaugural conference in the village of Kašina by receiving 148 votes from party delegates. Branimir Bunjac received 57 votes and was elected as the party's Vice President.

During the conference, eight different names were proposed for the party, which chose to name itself after its leader with a three-quarters supermajority.

Prior to 9 October 2019, the party was organized by General-secretary Ivan Despetović, who subsequently left the party as he felt it had strayed away from his roots and into what he described as "cheap populism".

Ideology

Economics and tax 
SIP has declared itself to be in opposition to the privatization and concession of resources and enterprises it deems to be of public importance. It also declared that it seeks a reduction in value-added tax (VAT) and opposes property taxes. It opposes the introduction of the Euro as Croatia's currency.

Foreign policy 
The party is firmly opposed to Croatia's membership of the European Union and NATO, as it sees Croatian membership in both organizations as incompatible with sovereignty. It instead proposes that Croatia should be militarily neutral. 

The party opposes the sanctions against Russia and has instead declared its support for "de-escalation of conflicts".

It supports the recognition of the State of Palestine as an independent and sovereign state and calls on Israel to withdraw from Palestinian territories.

Social, civil and environmental issues 
The party has expressed support for freedom of religion, explicitly including the rights of atheists. It supports the legalization of cannabis and LGBT rights, while opposing mandatory vaccination. 

It has declared an opposition to the use of 5G telecommunications, which it deems would increase the amount of "unnecessary radiation" to which Croatians are exposed. Instead it supports the expansion of fiber-optic communication as a means of increasing internet speeds. The party held a protest in Osijek against the introduction of a 5G telecom network in the town.

The party opposes nuclear power.

Immigration 
The party strongly opposes illegal immigration and has expressed support for the construction of a physical border barrier along the parts of the border affected by illegal immigration, as well as involving the Croatian Army in border patrols.

Election history

Legislative

President of Croatia
The following is a list of presidential candidates endorsed by the SIP in elections for President of Croatia.

References

External links 

Political parties established in 2019
Political parties in Croatia